Anticipatory grief refers to a feeling of grief occurring before an impending loss. Typically, the impending loss is the death of someone close due to illness. This can be experienced by dying individuals themselves and can also be felt due to non-death-related losses like a scheduled mastectomy, pending divorce, company downsizing, or war.

Stages 
The five stages model of grief – denial, anger, bargaining, depression, and acceptance, as proposed by Elisabeth Kübler-Ross – describes the process people undergo after learning of their own diagnosis of terminal illness. Anxiety, dread, guilt, helplessness, hopelessness, and feelings of being overwhelmed are also common. However, anticipatory grief is not simply normal grief begun earlier.

Identifying features 
Features identified specifically with anticipatory grief include heightened concern for the dying person, rehearsal of the death and attempts to adjust to the consequences of the death. The period can allow people to resolve issues with the dying person and to say goodbye. It may provide some sense of orientation and access to the grieving process. For some, it prompts conscious closure before the end/loss.

Grief happening prior to a loss presents a compounding issue of isolation because of a lack of social acceptance. Anticipatory grief doesn't usually take the place of post-loss grief: there is not a fixed amount of grief to be experienced, so grief experienced before the loss does not necessarily reduce grief after the death. However, there may be little grieving after the loss due to anticipatory grief.

How often anticipatory grief occurs is a subject of some controversy. For example, a study of widows found that they stayed with their husbands until the death and could only mourn once the death had occurred. Researchers suggest that to start to grieve as though the loss has already happened can leave the bereaved feeling guilt for partially abandoning the patient.

Many family members can find themselves in a caregiving role during their loved one's process of death. During the progression of the illness, the security and protectiveness of the caregiver also increases. Bouchal, Rallison and Sinclair discuss that, "the strong need to offer protection was part of the anticipatory mourning experience of striving to be with in the present".

In the process of anticipatory grief, family members also begin to prepare and reflect on how their lives will be once their loved one passes. There are many ways in which to perform reflection. These ways include: "...reading, journaling, thinking, and reflecting about how life might be like without their partner." The journal also expands on the premise that the preparation process is not an individual process. Those who are affected by the impending death often look towards one another for support as well as others who are involved in care such as nurses and social workers.

A direct correlation exists between anticipatory grieving and the caregiver's quality of life. In a quantitative study conducted by Al-Gamal and Long, the effect of a pediatric cancer diagnosis on parents had a negative impact on the majority of study participants. More specifically, parents reported experiencing increasing stress and a decrease in physical and mental health – all of which affect the process of anticipatory grief.

Ultimately, anticipatory grieving is an extremely dynamic process that differs between individuals. The outcomes of the grieving process depend on the preparation of death and the anticipatory grief process.

See also
 Delayed grief
 Disenfranchised grief

References

Death
Grief